Libicki may refer to:

People
Jan Filip Libicki (born 1971), a Polish politician.
Marcin Libicki (born 1939), a Polish politician.
Martin C. Libicki, an American Professor at the Frederick S. Pardee RAND Graduate School.